York United Football Club (formerly known as York9 FC) is a Canadian professional soccer club based in Toronto, Ontario. The club competes in the Canadian Premier League and plays its home games at York University's York Lions Stadium.

History

In December 2017, former Canadian international Jimmy Brennan stepped down as executive director of Aurora FC and announced his intentions to take a role within the Canadian Premier League. In March 2018, it was revealed that Brennan had been named executive vice-president of York Sports & Entertainment back in January. The following day, it was revealed that the company's president Preben Ganzhorn named himself as president of an unknown entity called York9 FC, believed to be a Canadian Premier League franchise.

On May 5, 2018, York Region was one of four groups accepted by the Canadian Soccer Association for professional club membership. Greenpark Group, headed by Carlo Baldassarra, was revealed as the owner of York9, with his son Mike as the chairman. Both Brennan and Ganzhorn were pictured at the Annual Meeting of the Members when the group was announced.

York9 FC was officially unveiled on May 10, 2018, as the first team to join the Canadian Premier League. As well as confirming their place in the league for the 2019 launch season, the club also revealed their crest, colours and branding. The club adopted the name York9 FC to represent the nine municipalities that make up York Region – Aurora, East Gwillimbury, Georgina, King, Markham, Newmarket, Richmond Hill, Vaughan, and Whitchurch-Stouffville. On July 27, 2018, York9 announced executive vice president of soccer operations Jimmy Brennan as the club's first head coach.

In August, York9 fielded a York Region Soccer Association Selects team to compete in the U17 International Soccer Cup held at York Lions Stadium. The team beat Juventus F.C. before losing to Toronto FC in the final.

The team has been called "Y9" and "The Nine Stripes" by the media and the league. York9's first match was the inaugural CPL match at Forge FC on April 27, 2019, launching the 905 Derby with a 1–1 draw, as Ryan Telfer scored the first goal in Canadian Premier League history.

To determine the Canadian Soccer Association's representative in the CONCACAF Champions League, York9 played in the 2019 Canadian Championship competing for the Voyageurs Cup. The team lost the quarterfinal to Montreal Impact after a 2–2 draw at home and a 1–0 loss at Montreal.

York9 was expected to begin their second season in the Canadian Premier League in April 2020 but the season was delayed by the COVID-19 pandemic. During the postponement, the club sold young midfielder Emilio Estevez to Dutch Eredivisie side ADO Den Haag, the first CPL player to be sold to a European top flight.

On December 11, 2020, the club was rebranded as York United FC, adopting a new crest and colour scheme along with the name change. While the original club name exclusively targeted York Region, the new branding also represents the City of Toronto. In their first season as York United FC, the club finished 4th in the 2021 Canadian Premier League season. They were eliminated from the playoffs after a 3–1 loss to Forge FC. Following the season, head coach Jim Brennan's tenure at the club ended after it was announced November 23, 2021, that his contract would not be extended. He was replaced by Martin Nash on December 21, 2021.

Stadium

York plays its home matches at York Lions Stadium in York University's Keele Campus in York University Heights, a neighbourhood of North York, Toronto. Initially, the club had planned to use Alumni Field, on the same campus, while York Lions Stadium was being renovated for use at the end of the season. Before the start of the 2021 season, the stadium was renovated with a larger, artificial turf pitch and the removal of the athletic track which surrounded the playing surface.

In 2018, the club announced plans to build a modular, wooden, 15,000-seat stadium within the next three years. , financing and location of the new stadium was yet to be determined.

In March 2022, Woodbine Racetrack announced plans to add an 8,000 seat soccer-specific stadium and adjoining training facilities in the northeast corner of their property in Rexdale, Etobicoke; this would be the presumed new home of York United and possibly house a future professional women's soccer club.

Crest and colours
The club's namesake and crest pays homage to The Queen's York Rangers, as well as Toronto and York Region's predecessors, York, Upper Canada and York County. The crest's shape is derived from that of The Queen's York Rangers, a Canadian Army regiment based in Toronto and York Region. A blue element on top of the shield symbolizes Lake Ontario, a body of water that rivers in York Region and Toronto flow into. The shield features a YU monogram and nine vertical stripes, a nod to the club's nickname "The Nine Stripes". A crown at the top of the shield represents Canada's monarchical history. A trillium and a maple leaf are incorporated into the crown's design, with the former representing Ontario.

Although the club does insinuate the crest used as inspiration is of the original Town of York, that then became the City of Toronto, the club's colours of dark green, dark blue, white, and gold, are taken from the coat of arms of the City of York, a former city that was later amalgamated into the new City of Toronto in 1998. Unlike the majority of clubs in the CPL, York typically uses home kits that are primarily white.

Former crest and colours

The club used its original branding while it was known as York9 FC, between 2018 and 2020. The main feature of the crest's design was nine beams at the top of the crest, one for each municipality in York Region. The upward angle of the bars is a nod to the region's motto "Ontario's Rising Star". A white trillium at the base of the crest recognized Ontario, the province's floral emblem since 1937.

The official club colours were light green, grey, and black (branded by the club as "electric green", "charcoal grey", and "black on black"). These colours symbolized the region's nature (in tandem with the club's environmental focus) and Black Creek.

Club culture 
Much more so than other CPL teams, York is a club which relies heavily on data and analytics to make decisions.

Supporters
A supporters' group called Generation IX was present at the club's launch event. Prior to the team's second season in 2020, two new supporters' groups formed: a student supporters' group based out of York University called The Green Lions and a female-led supporters' group called Dames of York.

Three new supporters' groups, Centre of the Universe, The Northern Corridor, and Eastenders 416, were formed in 2021.

Rivalries

York United has a geographic rivalry with Forge FC in nearby Hamilton.  As both towns use the 905 area code, it was used to name the derby between the league's closest teams.  On January 29, 2019, the Canadian Premier League announced that the inaugural match of the league was going to be a 905 Derby on April 27, 2019, in Hamilton. The match ended in a 1–1 draw.

Players and staff

Roster

Out on loan

Staff

Head coaches

Statistics include regular season and Canadian Championship matches.

Club captains

Records

Year-by-year 

1. Average attendance include statistics from league matches only.
2. Top goalscorer(s) includes all goals scored in league season, league playoffs, Canadian Championship, CONCACAF League, and other competitive continental matches.

All-time top scorers 

Note: Bold indicates active player

All-time top assists 

Note: Bold indicates active player

All-time most appearances 

Note: Bold indicates active player

Single-season records 

Note: Bold indicates active player

Awards

Canadian Premier League Awards

York United FC Fan Voted Awards

References

External links 

 

 
2018 establishments in Ontario
Association football clubs established in 2018
Soccer clubs in Toronto
Canadian Premier League teams